Friedrich "Fritz" Nicolai (11 December 1879 – 7 March 1946) was a German diver who competed in the 1906 Summer Olympics and in the 1908 Summer Olympics. In 1906 he finished eighth in the 10 metre platform competition.

Two years later at the 1908 Olympics he was eliminated in the semi-finals of the 3 metre springboard event after finishing third in his heat. In the 10 metre platform competition he was eliminated in the first round.

References

External links

1879 births
1946 deaths
German male divers
Olympic divers of Germany
Divers at the 1906 Intercalated Games
Divers at the 1908 Summer Olympics
20th-century German people